"Sorry I’m in Love" is a song written by Andreas Carlsson, Tamara Champlin, Emilia Rydberg, and recorded by Emilia Rydberg on her 2000 album, Emilia. The single was released in Sweden on 30 October 2000.

Track listings
Sorry I'm In Love (radio edit)
Sorry I'm In Love (instrumental version)

Maxi-single
Sorry I'm in Love (radio edit)
Sorry I'm in Love (JJ's club mix)
Sorry I'm in Love (JJ's radio)
Sorry I'm in Love (instrumental club version)

Charts

References 

2000 songs
2000 singles
Emilia Rydberg songs
English-language Swedish songs
Songs written by Emilia Rydberg
Universal Music Group singles
Songs written by Andreas Carlsson